Jennifer Pascual, DSG (born 1971) is an American organist and conductor. Since 2003, she has been the director of music at St. Patrick's Cathedral in New York City.

Education
Pascual earned a Bachelor of Music in piano and organ performance and music education from Jacksonville University, Master of Music in piano performance from the Mannes School of Music at The New School, and a Doctor of Musical Arts in organ performance from the Eastman School of Music at the University of Rochester.

Career
On February 13, 2002 Pascual was named associate director of music at the Cathedral Basilica of the Sacred Heart in Newark, New Jersey.

On September 1, 2003 she was named director of music at St. Patrick Cathedral in New York City by Eugene V. Clark, rector of St. Patrick Cathedral, and Edward Cardinal Egan, Archbishop of New York.

Pascual was charged with overseeing all of the music for the Pastoral Visit to New York by Pope Benedict XVI on his April 2008 Apostolic Journey to the United States. During the visit, she conducted the music for the Ecumenical Prayer Service at St. Joseph's Church, Yorkville (Manhattan), Mass at St. Patrick Cathedral, and Mass at Yankee Stadium.

She was also in charge of liturgical music for the Pastoral Visit to New York by Pope Francis during his September 2015 Apostolic Journey to the United States, conducting the music for Evening Prayer (Vespers) at St. Patrick Cathedral and Mass at Madison Square Garden.

Honors
She was named a Dame of St. Gregory the Great by Pope Benedict XVI in December 2008 for distinguished service to the Roman Catholic Church.

Discography
 Organ Music & Gregorian Chant
 Christmas Carols for Organ and Trumpet
 Joyful, Joyful We Adore Thee (choir)

References

1971 births
Living people
American organists
Women organists
Eastman School of Music alumni
Mannes School of Music alumni
Jacksonville University alumni
Music directors
Dames of St. Gregory the Great
21st-century American women musicians
21st-century American conductors (music)
21st-century organists
21st-century American keyboardists